Elections to City of Bradford Metropolitan District Council were held on Thursday, 5 May 1983, with one third of the council to be elected. The council remained under no overall control.

Election result

This result had the following consequences for the total number of seats on the council after the elections:

Ward results

References

1983 English local elections
1983
1980s in West Yorkshire